Alby is a suburb in Botkyrka Municipality within Stockholm.

Alby has one of the 100 stations of the Stockholm metro system.

Alby, a municipal area in Botkyrka, with a population of approximately 10,000, most of which live in the 3,000 apartments owned by the construction company Botkyrkabyggen.

Alby Centre
Alby centre was renovated during the 1990s, creating a new square and more premises for entrepreneurs.

During the year 2000, Alby centre has been repainted inside and Alby's only heated garage has received a substantial facelift. Additionally, two new shops were opened, and the health care centre increased its activity. The convenience store (Vi) makes large investments, and the whole of Alby exudes a new belief in the future.

Nature
Alby lies by a lake, called Albysjön. Alby invites a truly beautiful landscape for those who have chosen to live there. You live near 
by the forest and also the previously mentioned lake. Also not far from Alby lies Flottsbro, a place for fun recreation, both for winter and summer activities. Also one of the better baseball fields lies in Alby, and one of Europe's better softball teams practice and play in Alby. Also a small harbour lies in a small bay where the boats are protected from gust and waves. It has been there for a few decades now and still is a nice place to polish your boat during the spring.

Sights in Alby
Alby farm has ancestry from the Middle Ages. The farmhouse is built in Empire style with a strong classic impact. The farm got its final look in 1895. 1895-1913 the inventor Lars Magnus Ericsson owned the farm. Among other things, he built a drum mill and a building agency in concrete, similar to a Roman aqueduct, before he moved to Hågelby gård. Botkyrka municipality bought the farm in 1947 and today carries out social administration activities on the premises.

Sports
The following sports clubs are located in Alby:

 Konyaspor KIF

Stockholm urban area
Populated places in Botkyrka Municipality
Södermanland